Arachnia propionica is a Gram positive, aerotolerant anaerobic species of Arachnia, found as part of the normal human oral flora.

References

External links 

Type strain of Pseudopropionibacterium propionicum at BacDive -  the Bacterial Diversity Metadatabase

Further reading

Propionibacteriales